The Saint Petersburg Imperial Bolshoi Kamenny Theatre (The Big Stone Theatre of Saint Petersburg) was a theatre in Saint Petersburg.

It was built in 1783 to Antonio Rinaldi's Neoclassical design as the Kamenny (i.e., Stone) Theatre; Giovanni Paisiello’s opera Il mondo della luna was performed at the opening on 24 September. It was rebuilt in 1802 according to the designs of the architect Thomas de Thomon and renamed the Bolshoi, but burned down in 1811. The building was restored in 1818, and modified between 1826 and 1836 by Alberto Cavos to accommodate more modern machinery.

Until 1886, the Bolshoi Kamenny Theatre was principal theatre for both the Imperial Ballet and the Imperial Russian Opera. 

In 1886 the building was declared unsafe and, at the behest of the theatre director Ivan Vsevolozhsky, the ballet and opera performances moved to the Imperial Mariinsky Theatre, where they have remained ever since. The Imperial Bolshoi Kamenny Theatre was then torn down to make way for the Saint Petersburg Conservatory.

Notable premieres 

Operas
 A Life for the Tsar (1836) – Mikhail Glinka
 Ruslan and Lyudmila (1842) – Mikhail Glinka
 La forza del destino (1862) – Giuseppe Verdi

Ballets
 The Pharaoh's Daughter (1862) – chor. Marius Petipa, mus. Cesare Pugni
 The Beauty of Lebanon or The Mountain Spirit chor. by Marius Petipa mus. Cesare Pugni.
 The Little Humpbacked Horse (1864) – chor. Arthur Saint-Léon, mus. Cesare Pugni
 La Bayadère (1877) – chor. Marius Petipa, mus. Ludwig Minkus

References

Benois, Alexandre: Reminiscences of the Russian Ballet (London, Wyman & Sons, 1941)

 
Opera houses in Russia
Music venues completed in 1783
Theatres completed in 1783
1783 establishments in the Russian Empire